Claude Babé (born 17 January 1970) is a Gabonese footballer. He played in 14 matches for the Gabon national football team from 1994 to 2001. He was also named in Gabon's squad for the 1994 African Cup of Nations tournament.

References

External links
 

1970 births
Living people
Gabonese footballers
Gabon international footballers
1994 African Cup of Nations players
Place of birth missing (living people)
Association football goalkeepers
21st-century Gabonese people